Novae was initially one of the few great Roman legionary fortresses along the empire's border, forming part of the defences (limes Moesiae) along the Danube in northern Bulgaria. The settlement later expanded into a town in the Roman province of Moesia Inferior, later Moesia Secunda.

It lies about 4 km east of the modern town of Svishtov.

The fortress is one of the few along the limes to have been excavated and now open to the public.

Localisation and topography
The site of Novae is situated on the southern bank of the Danube at Pametnicite near Svishtov (a memorial site where the Russian army entered Bulgaria during the Turkish-Russian war in 1877) or Stǎklen (a place rich in glass – Bulg. stǎklo), as many ancient glass fragments are visible on the site (the production of glass is attested in late Roman Novae). The castra legionis covering an area of 18 hectares is situated on a slope with its lowest point at the river-bank and its highest point 30m higher in the southern part of the site. Its topography resulted in terraced levels within the defensive walls.

At present mainly the central part of the site has been excavated and restored.

History and archaeology

Permanent Roman military presence in the Lower Danubian region started from the beginnings of 1st century AD. Around AD 45 Legio VIII Augusta took part in the suppression of the Thracian uprising, was placed here and founded its castrum. At the same time the province of Moesia was already created. The legion with its detachments controlled the section of the Danube from the mouth of the Osum River (Asamus) up to the mouth of the Yantra River, near Iatrus.

After the death of Nero, the dislocation of many legions within the Empire resulted in replacement by emperor Vespasian in 69-70 AD of Legio VIII Augusta by Legio I Italica, which stayed in Novae at least to the 430s. In AD 86 the province was divided and Novae, together with Durostorum, became one of two legionary bases within the borders of Moesia Inferior. During the Dacian wars of Domitian (85-89) Novae did not suffer significant damage, which may indicate that the main operations took place in the western and eastern part of the province. The legion was followed by craftsmen, servicemen, traders and other camp followers who settled down in the fortress vicinity creating the canabae legionis. At the same time another settlement (vicus) emerged ca. 3 km to the east of the camp, in the place Ostrite Mogili

Novae served as a base of operations for Roman campaigns against Barbarian tribes including Trajan's Dacian Wars, and the last time during Maurice's Balkan campaigns. The legion was also responsible for bridge construction over the Danube.

Until the Flavian period the fortress walls were built from earth and wood. During the campaigns of Trajan the walls were replaced by stone wall up to 3m thick with square towers. Apart from the new defensive walls, the monumental building of headquarters (principia) with the new Trajanic basilica, and the new building of a hospital (valetudinarium) were built at the place of the former Flavian baths (thermae). It is possible that during the Antonine period the legion controlled the area beyond the Yantra River. The most prosperous times for Novae, as well as for the province, were during the Severan dynasty.

In 250 Novae was attacked by the Goths of Cniva but escaped damage, although the canabae and the nearby settlements were completely destroyed. In the second half of the 3rd century Novae was systematically attacked and destroyed by barbarians. From the 4th century onwards when the legion was divided into detachments occupying small forts and fortlets, civil buildings constituted the main part of internal buildings of Novae. The new streets with pavements were built from re-used stone, often bearing inscriptions. Many glass workshops were established, both in the town, as well as in its surroundings. At a certain moment the area of 8 ha to the east of the legionary base was surrounded by the new defensive walls.

The latest evidence for the presence of the legion is dated by a series of inscriptions from 430, 431 and 432.

In the late 5th and 6th centuries Novae was the seat of a bishop. The cathedral and neighbouring buildings were built over the legionary barracks west of the former legionary headquarters. The last period of prosperity was during the reign of Justinian (527-565) when the defensive walls were rebuilt and reinforced, but the attacks of Slavs and Avars eventually end the existence of the ancient town. In 9th – 11th centuries the church and a cemetery existed in the western part of the town.

Novae is supposed to be the home of the saint named Lupus, who is venerated in Greek and Romanian traditions.

Recent excavations have revealed the via principalis and other buildings. In 2018, possible Roman soldiers' burials were discovered near Novae.

Civilian settlements and the extramural area
The civil settlement (canabae legionis) were situated to the west of the legionary base. Another civil vicus has been located over 2 km east of the fortress, at Ostrite Mogili. One of the settlements was granted municipal rights, but only one inscription testifies this status.A splendid villa to the west of the defensive walls, within the canabae, could have been an official residence was destroyed by the Gothic invasions in mid-3rd century. 

Other minor settlements and places of cult were located but not systematically excavated.

The area to the south-east and east of the fortress was occupied by the necropolis, which was recently excavated., while the military amphitheatre is postulated on the north-eastern side of the camp.

Water supply to the fortress, particularly the baths including the nearby nymphaeum and to the town was ensured by three known aqueducts, one of which was at least 9 km long and fed the distribution tank (castellum divisorum) at the south-east corner of the fortress.

During the late Roman period the town was enlarged by a new line of defensive walls and covered 26 hectares jointly with the former legionary base.

Name of the site
At present we use the name of Novae (Nouae), although the toponym might have referred to the canabae (canabae legionis I Italicae Novae), when the castra itself had the name of castra legionis I Italicae. The literary sources give the name of Novae or in Accusative form Novas (Itin. Ant. 221, 4; Jord., Get., 101, Tab. Peut. VIII, 1; Not. Dign. Or. XL, 30, 31; Eugipp., 44, 4) and the Greek transcription – Nόβας given by Procopius (De aed. IV, 11), Theophanes Confessor (Chron., p. 423, 426, 436, ed. J. Classen) and Anonymous Ravennatis (IV, 7). The Greek form Nόβαι appears rather rare (Hierocl. Synecd. 636, 6; Theoph. Sim. VII, 2.16; VIII, 4.3-4); earlier form mentioned by Ptolemy is Nooῦαι (Ptol. III, 10.10).

One hypothesis derives the name from Νόης Nóēs, a river mentioned by Herodotus, which is then identified with the stream (now variously known as Dermendere, Tekirdere, Golyamata Bara, or Belyanovsko Dere) at whose mouth the fortress was located.

References

Literature
E. GENČEVA, P”rviât voenen lager v Novae (Dolna Miziâ), Sofia-Warszawa 2002.
L. PRESS, T. SARNOWSKI, Novae. Römisches Legionslager und frühbyzantinische Stadt an der unteren Donau, Antike Welt 21, 1990, 22.
T. SARNOWSKI, Fortress of the Legio I Italica at Novae, Akten des XI. Intern. Limeskongresses (Szekesfehervar, 30.8.-6.9.1976), 415-424.
T. SARNOWSKI, La fortresse de la legion I Italica et le limes du sud-est de la Dacie, Eos 71, 1983, p. 265-276.
T. SARNOWSKI, Novae in the Notitia Dignitatum, Archeologia (Warszawa) 57, 2007(2008).
T. SARNOWSKI, The Name of Novae in Lower Moesia, Archeologia (Warszawa) 57, 2007(2008).
A. TOMAS, Living with the Army, vol. I. Civil Settlements near Roman Legionary Fortresses in Lower Moesia, Warszawa 2017. 
IGLNov	Inscriptions grecques et latines de Novae (Mésie inférieure), J. Kolendo, V. Božilova [red.], Bordeaux 1997.

External links 
 Research in Novae by the Faculty of Archaeology University of Warsaw Expedition
 Excavations of the necropolis
 Bulgaria Travel - Novae Roman Town
 Archaeological Discoveries in Novae Continue
 Ancient Rome Festival Recreates Legionnaires' Fights in Bulgaria's Svishtov
 Mending bodies, saving souls: a history of hospitals
 BULGARIA: Heritage in Danger
 Festival of Ancient Heritage, Svishtov 2009
 Festival of Ancient Heritage and Hrubieszow Museum

Archaeological sites in Bulgaria
History of Veliko Tarnovo Province
Svishtov
Roman towns and cities in Bulgaria
Former populated places in Bulgaria
Buildings and structures in Veliko Tarnovo Province
Roman legionary fortresses in Bulgaria
Roman fortifications in Moesia Inferior